Tapan' is a South Asian given name. It may refer to:

Places
 Tapan, Azerbaijan, a village and municipality in Azerbaijan
 Tapan, Dakshin Dinajpur, a village in West Bengal, India
 Tapan, Homalin, Burma
 Tapan (Community development block), an administrative sub-district in West Bengal, India
 Tapan (Vidhan Sabha constituency), an assembly constituency in Dakshin Dinajpur district in the Indian state of West Bengal
 Geghasar, Armenia, formerly known as Tapan
 Ayuu-Tapan, a village in Osh Region of Kyrgyzstan

People
Tapan Acharya (born 1981), Indian actor, writer, producer and director in Marathi and Konkani Cinema
Tapan Banerjee (1943–2017), Indian cricketer
Tapan Barua (????-2014), Indian cricketer
Tapan Bhattacharya (born 1949), Indian cricketer
Tapan Chowdhury, Bangladeshi businessman
Tapan Chowdhury, Bangladeshi musician and former member of the musical band Souls
Tapan Das, Indian actor, director and story teller in Assamese cinema and theatre
Tapan Deb Singha, Indian politician from West Bengal, member of the West Bengal Legislative Assembly 
Tapan Kumar Pradhan, Indian poet, writer and activist 
Tapan Kumar Sarkar, Indian-American electrical engineer
Tapan Kumar Sen, Indian politician
Tapan Mahmud, Bangladeshi Rabindra Sangeet singer
Tapan Maity (born 1984), Indian football player
Tapan Misra, Indian scientist, director of Space Applications Centre, Indian Space Research Organisation
Tapan Mitra (1948–2019), Indian-born American economist
Tapan Raychaudhuri (1926-2014), Indian historian
Tapan Sikdar (1944–2014), Indian politician and government minister 
Tapan Sinha (1924-2009), Indian film director
Tapan Sharma (born 1975), Indian cricket umpire

Others
 Tapan (drum), or davul, a drum used in Balkan and Turkish music

See also
Tapani (disambiguation)